The Men's U21 African Volleyball Championship is a sport competition for national teams with players under 21 years, currently held biannually and organized by the African Volleyball Confederation, the Africa volleyball federation.

Result summary

Performance by nation

See also
Women's Africa Volleyball Championship U20

External links
Men's U21 Volleyball African Championship Archive - todor66.com

International volleyball competitions
African Volleyball Championships
Recurring sporting events established in 1984